WTNL (1390 AM) is a Christian radio station broadcasting a Southern Gospel format. It is licensed to Reidsville, Georgia, United States, and is owned by WRBX/WTNL.

References

External links

Moody Radio affiliate stations
Southern Gospel radio stations in the United States
TNL
TNL